In geometry, the ditrigonal dodecadodecahedron (or ditrigonary dodecadodecahedron) is a nonconvex uniform polyhedron, indexed as U41. It has 24 faces (12 pentagons and 12 pentagrams), 60 edges, and 20 vertices. It has extended Schläfli symbol b{5,}, as a blended great dodecahedron, and Coxeter diagram . It has 4 Schwarz triangle equivalent constructions, for example Wythoff symbol 3 |  5, and Coxeter diagram .

Related polyhedra 

Its convex hull is a regular dodecahedron. It additionally shares its edge arrangement with the small ditrigonal icosidodecahedron (having the pentagrammic faces in common), the great ditrigonal icosidodecahedron (having the pentagonal faces in common), and the regular compound of five cubes.

Furthermore, it may be viewed as a facetted dodecahedron: the pentagrammic faces are inscribed in the dodecahedron's pentagons. Its dual, the medial triambic icosahedron, is a stellation of the icosahedron.

It is topologically equivalent to a quotient space of the hyperbolic order-6 pentagonal tiling, by distorting the pentagrams back into regular pentagons. As such, it is a regular polyhedron of index two:

See also 
 List of uniform polyhedra

References

External links 
 

Uniform polyhedra